Acadia Broadcasting Limited is a Canadian radio broadcasting network that operates 5 FM radio stations in Northwestern Ontario and 10 in the Atlantic Canadian provinces of New Brunswick and Nova Scotia. It is owned by Ocean Capital Investments which is considered a part of the Irving Group of Companies. It is headquartered at 58 King Street in Saint John, New Brunswick. The company was formed by a 2001 operations merger between the Saint John based New Brunswick Broadcasting Company and the Bridgewater, Nova Scotia based Acadia Broadcasting Co. Limited. In 2003, the merged companies began operating under the simpler shared name, Acadia Broadcasting Limited. Since the merger, Acadia Broadcasting has launched new stations and acquired several stations owned and operated by other broadcasters throughout the provinces of Nova Scotia, New Brunswick and Ontario. Acadia Broadcasting radio stations attract a monthly average of over 400,000 listeners, and their websites see 5.3 million pageviews over the same period. Their markets are reached by an average of 8,400 advertising clients.

History
In 1928, CFBO was launched by C.A. Monro Limited. Mr. Monro had obtained a private commercial broadcasting license from the Department of Marine and Fisheries of the Dominion of Canada in Ottawa, dated April 1, 1928, for the purpose of setting up and operating an AM radio station of only 50 watts in Saint John, New Brunswick. This was radio license No. 23 issued in Canada.

In 1934, four newspaper publishing shareholders in Saint John, New Brunswick- Howard P. Robinson, J.D. McKenna, T.F. Drummie, and L.W. Bewick - purchased the station CFBO from C.A. Monro. Overnight, the station's new callsign became CHSJ, and it broadcast out of a new modern studio with new experienced management. Operated by Saint John Publishing Co. Limited, CHSJ soon became an affiliate of CBC Radio's Trans-Canada Network, an important link in the development of the national network.

In 1944, Kenneth C. Irving purchased Saint John Publishing Company Limited from its principal shareholder, Howard P. Robinson. With this purchase, Irving acquired both the radio station CHSJ and the two local newspapers. Later that year, the company name was changed to New Brunswick Publishing Company Limited and its subsidiary New Brunswick Broadcasting was responsible for CHSJ radio.

In 1989, New Brunswick Broadcasting purchased Acadia Broadcasting, CKBW in Bridgewater, Nova Scotia from the retiring shareholders.

In 2001, New Brunswick Broadcasting launched two new radio stations in New Brunswick, CHWV-FM in Saint John, New Brunswick and CHTD-FM in St. Stephen, New Brunswick.

In 2003, New Brunswick Broadcasting was folded into Acadia Broadcasting.

In May 2007, Acadia Broadcasting Limited acquired three radio stations in northern Ontario: CKDR-FM in Dryden, CJRL-FM in Kenora, and CFOB-FM in Fort Frances. Through a series of repeaters, CKDR-FM in Dryden also serves six other northern communities: Sioux Lookout, Hudson, Ear Falls, Red Lake, Atikokan, and Ignace.

In January 2010, Acadia acquired CJUK-FM and CKTG-FM in Thunder Bay, Ontario from Newcap Radio. On July 22, 2010, Acadia Broadcasting launched CJHK-FM in Bridgewater, Nova Scotia.

In March 2014, Acadia Broadcasting acquired CKNI-FM in Moncton, New Brunswick from Rogers Media.

In April 2016, Acadia acquired CJLS-FM in Yarmouth, Nova Scotia from Ray Zinck and Chris Perry.

On July 13, 2020, Evanov Radio Group announced its intent to sell CKHZ-FM and CKHY-FM in Halifax to Acadia.

Stations operated by Acadia Broadcasting

See also 

 List of radio stations in New Brunswick
 List of radio stations in Nova Scotia
 List of radio stations in Ontario

References

External links
 Acadia Broadcasting
Acadia Broadcasting Ltd. - Canadian Communications Foundation
Ocean Capital Investments
LinkedIn profile
Radio Stations in New Brunswick - Government of New Brunswick

Radio broadcasting companies of Canada
Companies based in Saint John, New Brunswick
Companies based in New Brunswick